Sarcomyxa is a small genus of agaricoid fungi in the Sarcomyxaceae. Basidiocarps (fruit bodies) are shelf-like and grow on wood. Sarcomyxa edulis is commercially cultivated for food in Asia.

The genus is the only member of Sarcomyxaceae, a classification established as a result of molecular research, based on cladistic analysis of DNA sequences.

See also
List of Agaricales genera
List of Agaricales families

References

Agaricales genera